SS Antilles was an American passenger-cargo ship launched in 1906. Chartered by the U.S. Army in 1917 for use as a troop transport ship, Antilles was sunk by a German U-boat on 17 October 1917, resulting in the loss of 67 lives. At the time of its destruction the Antilles sinking represented the largest single greatest loss of American lives to that point in World War I.

History

Construction

SS Antilles, official number 204018, was a 6,879 gross ton vessel constructed in the shipyards of William Cramp & Sons Shipbuilding Company, Philadelphia, Pennsylvania delivered April 1907.

The vessel was operated as a combined passenger and cargo ship by the Southern Pacific Steamship Company from the time of its launch until 1917. Antilles and sister ship Momus, along with several other ships, operated between New York and New Orleans with Southern Pacific Steamship's Morgan Line.

Destruction

Following American entry into World War I, selected by the Shipping Control Committee, Antilles was turned over 26 May 1917 and chartered by the United States Army for use as a civilian crewed U.S. Army Chartered Transport (USACT). The ship was among those in the first troop convoy to depart on 14 June, after considerable confusion and delays in troop loading, from the Hoboken Port of Embarkation. Antilles sailed from New York on 24 September in a four ship convoy, designated Group Number 8, composed of Antilles, a new Navy transport , another Army chartered transport  and another Army chartered ship that turned back, . The convoy made the crossing successfully but both Antilles and Finland were torpedoed on the return voyage.

On 17 October 1917, three days out of Saint Nazaire, France and two days out of Quiberon Bay where another ship had joined the convoy for the return voyage, Antilles was torpedoed by German U-boat  reportedly sinking in four and a half minutes after being hit. Both Aphrodite and Corsair had been among the escort on that first convoy to France in June. In rough weather Kanawha had been forced to turn back due to the weather with the convoy slowed by the same weather. At about 6:45 a.m., during a course change, Antilles was astern of Corsair and seen to suddenly sheer out of formation and began settling by the stern. Alcedo turned back to where Antilles had sunk and began picking up survivors while Corsair circled in a search for the submarine until about 8:30 with no sign of a submarine found and the search for survivors and the submarine discontinued at 10:30.

The majority, 118 survivors, were rescued by Alcedo with 50 rescued by Corsair. Among the fifty persons rescued by Corsair was then Brigadier General William Sharp McNair who had been ordered to return to take command of 151st Field Artillery Brigade. A total of 67 people died in the sinking. The loss of life was the first case in the war involving a large number of American casualties.

Survivors were landed in France on 21 October where they were immediately cared for by the Red Cross. Those that died were some of the first to come under the new war-insurance law allowing payment of $6,000 ($  in ) payable to families in installments of $25 ($ in ) per month over twenty years.

Footnotes

References

Bibliography

1906 ships
Merchant ships of the United States
Troop ships of the United States
Transport ships of the United States Army
Maritime incidents in 1917
Ships sunk by German submarines in World War I
World War I shipwrecks in the Atlantic Ocean
Ships built by William Cramp & Sons